Wendy Ross is an American developmental and behavioral pediatrician with a specific focus on autism. Ross founded Autism Inclusion Resources, a non-profit organization to help children with autism participate in everyday activities in their communities. Currently, Ross serves as the director of the new Center for Autism and Neurodiversity at Jefferson Health and Thomas Jefferson University.

Education
After completing her undergraduate studies at Brandeis University, Ross studied medicine at the Humanities and Medicine Program at Mt. Sinai School of Medicine in New York, and graduated in 1997. Ross completed her residency in pediatrics at Yale University in 2000. Ross completed her fellowship in behavioral pediatrics at Children’s Hospital Boston in 2002.

Professional experience
Ross worked as a developmental pediatrician at Children’s Hospital Boston and an instructor at Harvard Medical School until 2006, and then moved to Philadelphia and worked as the Director of Developmental Medicine and Genetics at The Albert Einstein Medical Center until July 2011.  Ross founded Autism Inclusion Resources in 2011, and founded her private practice, the Center for Pediatric Development, in 2012.

Aside from her work with autism, Ross serves as a board member of the Pennsylvania Branch of the International Dyslexia Association, in which she helps educate the local community about language based learning disabilities, ADHD, and their respective warning signs, diagnoses, and treatments.

Autism Inclusion Resources 
Autism Inclusion Resources (AIR) is a non-profit that provides services for children with autism.

Center for Autism and Neurodiversity

Personal life 
Wendy Ross married Michael Ross on June 8, 1997.  Michael Ross later died of colon cancer in September 2019.

Ross is Jewish and is an active member of the inclusion committee at her synagogue, Beth Am Israel, in Penn Valley, Pennsylvania.

Ross is the mother of two boys.

Awards 
In 2015, Ross was nominated to be a CNN Hero for her work with children with autism.

In 2018, the Council of the City of Philadelphia honored Ross during Autism Awareness Month.

Ross graduated from the Mt. Sinai School of Medicine as a member of the Alpha Omega Alpha medical honor society.

During her residency training at Yale, Ross received the Morris Y. Krosnick Award for Dedication, Compassion, and Caring.

In 2019, Ross received a Main Line Parent of the Year award from LOVE Magazine

References

American pediatricians
Women pediatricians
Year of birth missing (living people)
Living people
Brandeis University alumni